Maureen New (born 28 December 1963) is a Canadian swimmer. She competed in the women's 4 × 100 metre freestyle relay at the 1984 Summer Olympics.

References

External links
 

1963 births
Living people
Canadian female freestyle swimmers
Olympic swimmers of Canada
Swimmers at the 1984 Summer Olympics
Swimmers from Edmonton
Commonwealth Games medallists in swimming
Commonwealth Games gold medallists for Canada
Swimmers at the 1982 Commonwealth Games
Universiade medalists in swimming
Universiade bronze medalists for Canada
Medallists at the 1982 Commonwealth Games